Juee is a village in the Pauri Garhwal district of the Indian state of Uttarakhand. , the village had a total population of 172 of which 85 were male and 87 female.

References

External links 
 Official website of Uttarakhand Government

Villages in Pauri Garhwal district